The Fresh Breeze Twin is a German paramotor that was designed and produced by Fresh Breeze of Wedemark for powered paragliding.

Design and development
The aircraft was designed in the 1990s and features a paraglider-style high-wing, two-place accommodation and a single two-stroke engine in pusher configuration. As is the case with all paramotors, take-off and landing is accomplished by foot, with both occupants running together.

The Twin was one of the first paramotors designed for training use and its tandem seating allows easy communication between instructor and student.

Specifications (Twin)

References

1990s German ultralight aircraft
Single-engined pusher aircraft
Paramotors
Twin